The Hyundai Aero Town (hangul:현대 에어로타운) is a medium-duty midicoach manufactured by the truck & bus division of Hyundai. It was introduced in 1994. It is primarily used as a midcoach and a smaller intercity bus as either a complete bus or a bus chassis. It is distinguishable by a front 'Aero Town' badge, but the common Hyundai badge is usually on the rear. Its primary competitors with the Daewoo BH090 Royal Star and Daewoo BS090 Royal Midi, and its related to the now-discontinued Asia/Kia Cosmos AM818.

It was replaced by Hyundai Green City

Models
There are two variants of the Aero Town:
Aero Town standard body: short wheelbase midibus.
Aero Town long body: long wheelbase midibus.

See also

Hyundai Motor Company
List of buses

References

Hyundai buses
Rear-wheel-drive vehicles
Buses of South Korea
Midibuses
Coaches (bus)
Vehicles introduced in 1996